Kunigal Ramanath (1932/3 – 1 February 2016) was an Indian Kannada actor, known for Ranganayaki (1981). He also acted in several other movies like Prana Snehitha. He died on 1 February 2016 at the age of 83.

References

External links

Indian male film actors
Kannada male actors
1930s births
2016 deaths
Place of birth missing